James Clark (born January 8, 1936) is an American former sports shooter. He competed in the trap event at the 1960 Summer Olympics.

References

1936 births
Living people
American male sport shooters
Olympic shooters of the United States
Shooters at the 1960 Summer Olympics
People from Borger, Texas
Sportspeople from Texas